The president of the Balearic Islands is the head of government of the Balearic Islands, one of the 17 autonomous communities of Spain, while the monarch Felipe VI remains the head of state as King of Spain (and therefore of the Balearic Islands).

List of officeholders
Governments:

Timeline

References

Politics of the Balearic Islands